Scooter Forever is the nineteenth studio album by German band Scooter, released on 1 September 2017 through Sheffield Tunes and Kontor Records. It is the last studio album featuring Phil Speiser, who had been with the band since 2014. It is also the first Scooter album since 2009's "Under the Radar Over the Top" to consist of primarily jumpstyle songs.

Track listing

Notes
 "In Rave We Trust" retitled "In Rave We Trust - Amateur Hour" on later versions.

Sample credits
 "In Rave We Trust" contains an interpolation of the 1974 song "Amateur Hour" by Sparks.
 "Bora! Bora! Bora!" contains an interpolation of the 1986 song "Catch the Fox (Caccia Alla Volpe)" by Den Harrow. The melody has previously been used by Scooter in the song "The United Vibe" from the 2007 album The Ultimate Aural Orgasm. Both Scooter songs are probably inspired by the 2003 song "Goin' Crazy (Cum Fiesta)" by Hard Body Babes.
 "My Gabber" is an English version of the 2016 song "Me Gabber" originally performed by JeBroer.
 "Wall Of China (See the Light)" is based on the 2007 song "See the Light (Styles & Breeze Remix)" by Paradise.
 "As the Years Go By" contains an interpolation of the 1999 song "Ein Lied für diese Welt" by Dana Winner.
 "The Roof" contains an interpolation of the 1974 song "Only You Can" by Fox.
 "Kiss Goodnight" contains an interpolation of the 2002 song "Let's Play" by Lexy & K-Paul feat. Atomek Dogg.
 "The Darkside" is a rework of the 1999 song by Hypetraxx.
 "Always Look on the Bright Side of Life" is based on the same name 1979 song taken from the motion picture Monty Python's Life of Brian.

Charts

References

2017 albums
Scooter (band) albums